Brookside is a village in eastern Belmont County, Ohio, United States. The population was 538 at the 2020 census.  It is part of the Wheeling metropolitan area.

Geography
Brookside is located at  (40.071422, -80.760632).

Demographics

2010 census
As of the census of 2010, there were 632 people, 282 households, and 193 families living in the village. The racial makeup of the village was 96.2% White, 1.9% African American, 0.5% Native American, 0.2% from other races, and 1.3% from two or more races. Hispanic or Latino of any race were 0.3% of the population.

There were 282 households, of which 26.2% had children under the age of 18 living with them, 47.9% were married couples living together, 14.2% had a female householder with no husband present, 6.4% had a male householder with no wife present, and 31.6% were non-families. 27.0% of all households were made up of individuals, and 12.1% had someone living alone who was 65 years of age or older. The average household size was 2.24 and the average family size was 2.66.

The median age in the village was 44.5 years. 19.1% of residents were under the age of 18; 6.3% were between the ages of 18 and 24; 25.7% were from 25 to 44; 31.3% were from 45 to 64; and 17.7% were 65 years of age or older. The gender makeup of the village was 48.4% male and 51.6% female.

2000 census
As of the census of 2000, there were 644 people, 283 households, and 191 families living in the village. The population density was 3,714.7 people per square mile (1,462.6/km2). There were 304 housing units at an average density of 1,753.5 per square mile (690.4/km2). The racial makeup of the village was 97.05% White, 2.17% African American, 0.31% from other races, and 0.47% from two or more races.

There were 283 households, out of which 25.8% had children under the age of 18 living with them, 55.1% were married couples living together, 9.9% had a female householder with no husband present, and 32.2% were non-families. 30.4% of all households were made up of individuals, and 18.4% had someone living alone who was 65 years of age or older. The average household size was 2.28 and the average family size was 2.79.

In the village, the population was spread out, with 19.6% under the age of 18, 7.8% from 18 to 24, 23.4% from 25 to 44, 29.5% from 45 to 64, and 19.7% who were 65 years of age or older. The median age was 44 years. For every 100 females there were 83.5 males. For every 100 females age 18 and over, there were 83.0 males.

The median income for a household in the village was $34,297, and the median income for a family was $43,594. Males had a median income of $31,250 versus $25,625 for females. The per capita income for the village was $17,295. About 5.1% of families and 7.8% of the population were below the poverty line, including 11.1% of those under age 18 and 10.0% of those age 65 or over.

References

Villages in Belmont County, Ohio
Villages in Ohio